Kulwant Singh (born 1948) is an Indian field hockey player. He won a bronze medal at the 1972 Summer Olympics in Munich.

References

External links

1948 births
Living people
Olympic field hockey players of India
Field hockey players at the 1972 Summer Olympics
Indian male field hockey players
Olympic bronze medalists for India
Olympic medalists in field hockey
Asian Games medalists in field hockey
Field hockey players at the 1970 Asian Games
Medalists at the 1972 Summer Olympics
Asian Games silver medalists for India
Medalists at the 1970 Asian Games